Alberona is an upland village and comune of the province of Foggia and region of Apulia, in southeast Italy.

References

Cities and towns in Apulia